Otto Bülte (4 September 1886 – after 1914), nicknamed Otte, was a German footballer who played for Eintracht Braunschweig and BFC Preussen. He was also capped once for the German national team, in a friendly against the Netherlands.

Notes

References

External links
 

1886 births
Year of death missing
People from Wolfenbüttel (district)
Footballers from Lower Saxony
People from the Duchy of Brunswick
German footballers
Germany international footballers
Association football midfielders
BFC Preussen players
Eintracht Braunschweig players